The SuperSplendor is a standard lightweight motorcycle produced since 2005 by Hero Honda. Since it was released, this motorcycle has gone through numerous changes. The horizontal engine gave it extra stability. It is the ultimate edition in the series Hero Honda Splendor manufactured by Hero Honda. Later, it was re-modeled by Hero MotoCorp, giving it new functions like digital speedometer, a front disc brake replacing the drum brake, and a new look with alloy wheels.

References

"Hero Honda Super Splendor"

Related bikes
Hero Honda Ambition 135 
Hero Honda Karizma R 
Hero Splendor 
Hero Honda Hunk 
Hero Passion 
Hero Pleasure 
Hero Honda Achiever 
Honda Shine 
Honda Unicorn 
Hero Honda CBZ 
Hero Honda Karizma 
Hero Honda Karizma ZMR
Honda Activa

External links
 

Hero Honda motorcycles